WFLL (1400 AM; "Nossa Rádio 1400") is a radio station in Fort Lauderdale, Florida, serving the Miami-Fort Lauderdale radio market. It airs a Brazilian Portuguese Ethnic format. The station is owned by International Church of the Grace of God, Inc.

History
The station went on the air as WFTL on September 16, 1946. It was first located on a houseboat on the New River in downtown Fort Lauderdale. WFTL was once the sister station to WFTL-FM 106.7. Today, the 106.7 FM frequency is known under the WXDJ call sign and brands itself as "El Zol 106.7."

The call was changed briefly to WFFL and then on July 16, 2003, the station changed its call sign to the current WFLL.

Up until March 1, 2008, the station was broadcasting a Caribbean format using the name "Mystik 1400." WFLL then served as an ESPN Radio affiliate until the third week of August 2010. It aired a country music format through September 11, 2011. The station changed to a Brazilian Portuguese station on the following day.

WFLL, along with co-owned stations KBXD, WFTL, and WMEN, was purchased out of bankruptcy by Mark Jorgenson's ACM JCE IV B LLC in a transaction that was consummated on August 6, 2015, at a purchase price of $5.5 million.

As of 2017, WFLL is no longer affiliated with or carrying the Portuguese language broadcasts of Nossa Radio. According to the FCC's Silent AM Broadcast Station Lists, WFLL 1400 has been silent since July 2017. As part of the FCC's AM Revitalization Plan, and when it returns to air, WFLL plans to broadcast its signal on an FM translator -- W296DK – heard on 107.1 FM at 99 watts near the Hard Rock Stadium in Miami Gardens with a listenable signal extending from Ft. Lauderdale to Miami Beach. The station resumed operations in March 2018.

Effective September 28, 2018, Mark Jorgenson sold WFLL to International Church of the Grace of God, Inc. for $650,000.

References

External links
FCC History Cards for WFLL

Brazilian-American culture
Brazilian-American history
Hispanic and Latino American culture in Florida
Portuguese-language radio stations in the United States
Radio stations established in 1946
FLL
1946 establishments in Florida